Farago, Faragò or Faragó is the surname of the following people:
Andras Farago, Professor of Computer Science at the University of Texas at Dallas
Andrew Farago (born 1976), American museum curator and author
Clara Faragó (1905–1944), Hungarian chess master
Elena Farago (1878–1954), Romanian poet, translator and children's author
Iván Faragó (1946–2022), Hungarian chess grandmaster
János Faragó (1946–1984), Hungarian athlete
Joe Farago, American actor and television personality
Katinka Faragó (born 1936), Swedish film producer
Ladislas Farago (1906–1980), Hungarian military historian and journalist 
Lajos Faragó (born 1932), Hungarian footballer
Paolo Faragò (born 1993), Italian football player
Tamás Faragó (born 1952), Hungarian water polo player
Tamás Faragó (musician) (born 1982), Hungarian indie musician
Tyson Farago (born 1991), Canadian association football player

See also
Faragó, the Hungarian name for Fărăgău Commune, Mureș County, Romania